The North Point Water Tower was built in 1873 and 1874 as part of Milwaukee, Wisconsin's first public waterworks, with Victorian Gothic styling unusually handsome for a water tower. It was added to the National Register of Historic Places in 1973.

History
The City of Milwaukee was authorized by the Wisconsin Legislature to construct the water tower in 1871. Designed by Charles A. Gombert, it was built out of limestone from Wauwatosa, Wisconsin to house the wrought iron standpipe.

The building cost more than $50,000 to complete, far exceeding the original $8,000 estimate.

A pumping station below the bluff drew water from Lake Michigan and pumped it onward into the municipal waterworks.  The pipe inside the tower—four feet across and 120 feet tall—served to buffer the rest of the waterworks from destructive pulsations from the massive pumps. The standpipe was surrounded by the stone tower to keep its water from freezing.

References

Government buildings on the National Register of Historic Places in Wisconsin
Water towers in Wisconsin
Buildings and structures in Milwaukee
Limestone buildings in the United States
Gothic Revival architecture in Wisconsin
Infrastructure completed in 1871
Towers completed in 1871
National Register of Historic Places in Milwaukee